This article is a catalog of actresses and models who have appeared on the cover of Harper's Bazaar Arabia, the Arabic edition of Harper's Bazaar magazine, starting with the magazine's first issue in March 2007.

2007

2008

2009

2010

2011

2012

2013

2014

2015

2016

2017

2018

2019

2020

2021

External links
 Harper's Bazaar Arabia
 Harper's Bazaar Arabia on Models.com
 The 100th Issue: Happy Birthday Harper’s Bazaar

Arabia